Reyna Gallegos is a Mexican former luchadora, or female professional wrestler who was active from 1980 through the late 1990s. She was the first holder of the Mexican National Women's Championship to be sanctioned by the Mexico City Boxing and Wrestling Commission when women's wrestling was allowed in Mexico City after a 30-year ban. She initially retired in 1988 because she was pregnant, but returned in the early 1990s after the death of her husband. Over the years she worked primarily for the Universal Wrestling Association (UWA) and later on for AAA.

Championships and accomplishments
Empresa Mexicana de Lucha Libre'
Mexican National Women's Championship (1 time

Luchas de Apuestas record

References

1959 births
Living people
Mexican female professional wrestlers